Camrose Colony may refer to:

 Camrose Colony, Montana
 Camrose Colony, South Dakota